The 2007 Delaware Fightin' Blue Hens football team represented the University of Delaware as a member of the South Division of the Colonial Athletic Association (CAA) during the 2007 NCAA Division I FCS football season. Led by sixth-year head coach K. C. Keeler, the Fightin' Blue Hens compiled an overall record of 11–4 with a mark of 5–3 in conference play, tying for third place in the CAA's South Division. Delaware advanced to the NCAA Division I Football Championship playoffs, where the Fightin' Blue Hens beat Delaware State in the first round, Northern Iowa in the quarterfinals, and Southern Illinois in the semifinals before losing to Appalachian State in the NCAA Division I Championship Game. The team played home games at Delaware Stadium in Newark, Delaware.

Preseason

Conference changes
The 2007 season marked the first season of play for the Colonial Athletic Association, which was formed in 2005. From 1997 to 2006, the Delaware Blue Hens football team was a member of the Atlantic 10 Conference. Delaware, along with Hofstra University, James Madison University, the University of Maine, the University of Massachusetts, the University of New Hampshire, Northeastern University, the University of Rhode Island, the University of Richmond, Towson University, Villanova University, and the College of William & Mary, left the Atlantic 10 Conference to form the twelve-team conference.

Recruiting class
The Blue Hens received 17 letters of intent on National Signing Day, February 7, 2007.

Transfers
The Blue Hens received three transfer students prior to the start of the 2007 season in defensive end Ronald Talley from Notre Dame, linebacker Johnathon Smith from Connecticut, and running back Jerry Butler from Wisconsin. Talley left Notre Dame midway through the 2006 season before transferring to Delaware. On August 27, offensive tackle Anthony Grosso transferred from Florida State after leaving the squad a week prior.

Preseason awards
Projected starting running back Omar Cuff earned Preseason first-team All-CAA honors, Lindy's College Football Preview Magazine Preseason All-America honors, and The Sports Network Preseason third-team All-America honors.

Schedule

Game summaries

William & Mary

In the first CAA Conference game of the newly formed conference's history, Delaware senior running back Omar Cuff tied an NCAA record with seven touchdowns in the game. Cuff tied with Archie Amerson of Northern Arizona, who set the record in 1996, and Jessie Burton of McNeese State, who tied the record in 1998. Cuff rushed for 244 yards and six touchdowns on 30 attempts, with four receptions for 52 yards and a touchdown. Senior quarterback Joe Flacco passed for 202 yards and one touchdown in the 49–31 victory over William & Mary.

With the win, the Blue Hens became 1–0 on the season.

West Chester

In the first quarter of Delaware's home-opener against the West Chester Golden Rams, quarterback Joe Flacco led the Blue Hens on a 62-yard drive that ended in a seven-yard touchdown run by Omar Cuff. On the Golden Rams' next drive, a tipped pass resulted in a Delaware interception. The Blue Hens took advantage of this opportunity, ending the drive with a one-yard touchdown run by Cuff. The Blue Hens led the West Chester Golden Rams 34–0 heading into halftime.

Cuff scored rushing four touchdowns in the first half, with 21 rushes for 93 yards in the 41–14 win. Freshman running back Phillip Thaxton, who replaced Cuff in the second half, rushed for 177 yards on 12 attempts. On his first collegiate carry, he scored a 62-yard touchdown. His 177 yards was the most by a Blue Hen in his debut in college. Flacco finished with 305 yards, with wide receiver Mark Duncan catching five passes for 121 yards. Delaware finished with 599 yards of total offense in their fourteenth-straight win over West Chester.

With the win, the Blue Hens extended their record to 2–0.

Rhode Island

Joe Flacco passed for 337 yards and three touchdowns on 25 completions. Junior wide receiver Aaron Love, playing through groin and shoulder injuries, caught 10 passes for 137 yards and one touchdown. Mark Duncan caught six receptions for 109 yards. Freshman cornerback Anthony Walters made five tackles and recovered a fumble in the endzone for a touchdown.

Towson

The Delaware defense held Towson's offense to 157 total yards, with seven sacks on the quarterback. Sophomore defensive end Matt Marcorelle made six tackles with three sacks for 27 yards. Omar Cuff rushed for 109 yards and three touchdowns on 27 carries. Joe Flacco passed for 274 yards and one interception. Aaron Love made seven receptions for 107 yards.

Monmouth

Omar Cuff rushed for 73 yards and two touchdowns on 16 carries, and caught a touchdown pass. He became the school's all-time scoring leader with 314 points, breaking the previous record of 308. Joe Flacco passed for 215 yards and two touchdowns. Cornerback Fred Andrew returned an interception for a touchdown of 78 yards. Phillip Thaxton rushed for a 14-yard touchdown, and tight end Robbie Agnone caught an 11-yard touchdown pass. Freshman safety Cody Cipalla made seven tackles (four solo).

New Hampshire

Joe Flacco passed for 419 yards and two touchdowns with 40 completions and 51 pass attempts. Omar Cuff rushed for 88 yards on 22 carries and made seven receptions for 68 yards and a touchdown. He broke the school record for rushing touchdowns in a career with 49. The previous record was 47 by Daryl Brown in 1991–1994. Defensive end Ronald Talley blocked a field goal attempt by New Hampshire kicker Tom Manning.

Northeastern

Omar Cuff rushed for 200 yards and two touchdowns on 39 carries and caught a touchdown pass. Kicker Jon Striefsky kicked three field goals of 37, 31 and 19 yards. Joe Flacco passed for 222 yards and one touchdown on 17 completions. Robbie Agnone and wide receiver Kervin Michaud both caught five passes.

Navy

Omar Cuff rushed for 141 yards and four touchdowns on 28 carries. Joe Flacco passed for a career-high 434 yards and four touchdowns on 30 completions. Kervin Michaud made eight receptions for 96 yards and two touchdowns. Robbie Agnone caught seven passes for 133 yards. Junior linebacker Erik Johnson made 20 tackles, and Anthony Bratton made 12 tackles and recovered a fumble.

James Madison

Omar Cuff rushed for 101 yards and three touchdowns on 28 attempts and made seven receptions for 66 yards. Joe Flacco went 33-for-41 and passed for 257 yards. He also rushed for one touchdown. Aaron Love made nine receptions for 94 yards. Anthony Walters recovered a fumble and intercepted a James Madison pass. Jon Striefsky made three field goals in the first half of the game.

Richmond

Joe Flacco passed for 375 yards and three touchdowns and rushed for two touchdowns. Mark Duncan made nine receptions for 157 yards and two touchdowns. Omar Cuff rushed for 189 yards and two touchdowns on a school-record 48 attempts.

Villanova

Joe Flacco went 17-of-31 and passed for 145 yards. Omar Cuff, playing through a back injury, rushed for 75 yards on 17 attempts. Aaron Love made seven receptions for 79 yards, and Anthony Walters made seven tackles.

Delaware State

Omar Cuff rushed for a school-record 288 yards and four touchdowns on 38 carries. The previous record for rushing yards in a game was 272 by Daryl Brown in 1994. Cuff also broke the single-season rushing record with 1,657 yards. The previous record was 1,625 by Germaine Bennett in 2003. Joe Flacco passed for 189 yards and one touchdown on 11 completions.

Northern Iowa

Erik Johnson recovered a fumble and returned it 55 yards for a touchdown in the second quarter. Joe Flacco passed for 312 yards and two touchdowns and scored a one-yard rushing touchdown in the fourth quarter. He broke the school record for passing yards in a season with 3,686. The previous record was 3,436 by Matt Nagy in 2000. Omar Cuff rushed for 102 yards and one touchdown on 28 carries. Mark Duncan caught eight receptions for 112 yards and one touchdown. Jon Striefsky missed two extra point attempts in the first half, but made two field goals distancing 47 and 42 yards.

Southern Illinois

Joe Flacco went 21-of-38 and passed for 243 yards and two touchdowns. Jon Striefsky kicked two field goals, breaking the school's and conference's single-season records for field goals with 21. Omar Cuff rushed for 102 yards and caught four passes for 67 yards.

Appalachian State

Joe Flacco passed for 336 yards and one touchdown. Omar Cuff rushed for 83 yards and one touchdown. The record attendance of 23,010 on hand at Finley Stadium was the largest neutral site crowd for the NCAA Division I Championship Game.

Awards and honors

Players

Robbie Agnone
The Sports Network NCAA Division I Football Championship Subdivision honorable mention All-American
 Greg Benson
CAA Academic All-Conference
 Rich Beverley
Third-team All-CAA
 Brian Brown
CAA Academic All-Conference
Mike Byrne
First-team All-CAA
Walter Camp first-team All-American
ESPN The Magazine CoSIDA Academic All-District 2
Associated Press FCS third-team All-American
The Sports Network NCAA Division I Football Championship Subdivision second-team All-American
First-team All-ECAC Division I Football Championship Subdivision
College Sporting News Fabulous 50 NCAA Division I Football Championship Subdivision All-American
Football Championship Subdivision Athletics Directors Association National Academic All-Star
Colonial Athletic Association Student-Athlete of the Year Award
CAA Academic All-Conference
 Brad Casalvieri
CAA Academic All-Conference
 Cody Cipalla
CAA Rookie of the Week (Oct. 2)
Omar Cuff
CAA Offensive Player of the Week (Sept. 5)
The Sports Network National Offensive Player of the Week (Sept. 5)
College Sporting News National Offensive Player of the Week (Sept. 5)
First-team All-CAA
Walter Camp first-team All-American
American Football Coaches Association first-team All-American
Associated Press FCS first-team All-American
The Sports Network NCAA Division I Football Championship Subdivision first-team All-American
First-team All-ECAC Division I Football Championship Subdivision
College Sporting News Fabulous 50 NCAA Division I Football Championship Subdivision All-American
The Sports Media and Entertainment Network Running Back of the Year
Joe Flacco
CAA Offensive Player of the Week (Oct. 29)
Colonial Athletic Association Co-Offensive Player of the Year
First-team All-CAA
The Sports Network NCAA Division I Football Championship Subdivision third-team All-American
Eastern College Athletic Conference Player of the Year
First-team All-ECAC Division I Football Championship Subdivision
Pro Football Weekly honorable mention All-American
CAA Academic All-Conference
 Kheon Hendricks
First-team All-CAA
The Sports Network NCAA Division I Football Championship Subdivision honorable mention All-American
 Jon Herrman
CAA Academic All-Conference
 Rick Jarnagin
CAA Academic All-Conference
 Erik Johnson
CAA Academic All-Conference
 J. T. Laws
2007 Blue Hen Team Sportsmanship Award
CAA Academic All-Conference
 Aaron Love
Sports Media Entertainment Network Weekly Star (Sept. 18)
First-team All-CAA
The Sports Network NCAA Division I Football Championship Subdivision honorable mention All-American
 Mark Mackey
CAA Academic All-Conference
Matt Marcorelle
CAA Defensive Player of the Week (Sept. 25)
Third-team All-CAA
The Sports Network NCAA Division I Football Championship Subdivision honorable mention All-American
College Sporting News Fabulous 50 NCAA Division I Football Championship Subdivision All-American
 Kervin Michaud
Third-team All-CAA
 Jon Striefsky
CAA Special Teams Player of the Week (Nov. 7)
First-team All-CAA
Associated Press FCS first-team All-American
The Sports Network NCAA Division I Football Championship Subdivision first-team All-American
 Phillip Thaxton
CAA Rookie of the Week (Sept. 13)
 Anthony Walters
CAA Rookie of the Week (Sept. 18)

Coaches
K. C. Keeler
Maxwell Club Tri-State Coach of the Year Award
Johnny Vaught Head Coach Award

Other awards
2007 Lambert Cup
Eastern College Athletic Conference Team of the Year

Postseason
Quarterback Joe Flacco was invited to participate in the 2008 NFL Scouting Combine that took place February 21–24, 2008. Flacco was selected to play in the 83rd East–West Shrine Game that took place on January 19, 2008 at the University of Houston's Robertson Stadium, but declined after he was invited to play in the 2008 Senior Bowl that took place on January 26, 2008 at Ladd–Peebles Stadium in Mobile, Alabama.

Flacco was selected by the Baltimore Ravens in the first round (18th overall) of the 2008 NFL Draft. Flacco was the only Blue Hen selected in the draft, but three other players signed with NFL teams as undrafted free agents. Offensive guard Rich Beverley was signed by the Washington Redskins, offensive tackle Mike Byrne was signed by the Miami Dolphins, and running back Omar Cuff was signed by the Tennessee Titans.

References

Delaware
Delaware Fightin' Blue Hens football seasons
Delaware Fightin' Blue Hens football